{{Infobox basketball club
| name = Kurasini Heat
| color1 = white
| color2 =black
| color3 = red
| logo = Kurasini Heat logo.png
| image_size=130px
| nickname = 
| league =Regional Basketball League National Basketball League
| conference = 
| division = 
| founded = 
| dissolved = 
| history = 
| arena = 
| capacity = 
| location = Dar es Salaam, Tanzania
| colors = 
| current = 
| sponsor = 
| media = 
| chairman = 
| president =  
| vice-presidents = 
| manager = 
| coach =   
| captain = 
| ownership = 
| championships = 1 NBL championship1 RBL championship1'' Siwhata Cup
| conf_champs = 
| div_champs = 
| season = 
| position = 
| website = 
| 1_body = 000000
| 1_pattern_b = _redshoulders
| 1_shorts = 000000
| 1_pattern_s = _redbottom
| 2_body = FFFFFF
| 2_pattern_b = _redshoulders
| 2_shorts = FFFFFF
| 2_pattern_s =  _redbottom
}}Kurasini Heat is a Tanzanian basketball club based in Dar es Salaam. The team competes in the Regional Basketball League (RBL) and the National Basketball League (NBL).

In 2020, the Heat won its first NBL championship. As such, the team claimed a ticket to play in the qualifiers for the 2022 BAL season.

HonoursNational Basketball LeagueChampions (1): 2020Regional Basketball League (RBL)Champions (1): 2020Shiwata CupChampions (1):''' 2007

Players

Current roster
The following is the Kurasini Heat roster for the 2022 BAL Qualifying Tournaments.

References

External links
Official Instagram

Basketball teams in Tanzania
Road to BAL teams
Sport in Dar es Salaam